Downtown Run, known in North America as City Racer, is a 2003 vehicular combat racing game developed by Ubi Soft Romania and released for PlayStation 2, Windows, GameCube, and mobile phones. The game features many different cars, game modes and tracks. In most game modes, you can collect power-ups to maximise your chance of winning or slow down opponents.

Reception

The PC version received "generally favorable reviews", while the GameCube version received "mixed" reviews, according to the review aggregation website Metacritic.

References

2003 video games
Cancelled Nintendo DS games
GameCube games
Mobile games
PlayStation 2 games
Ubisoft games
Video games about police officers
Video games developed in Romania
Windows games